Christopher Kenneth Hatcher (born January 7, 1969) is an American former professional baseball outfielder in
Major League Baseball (MLB) who played in eight games for the Kansas City Royals during its 1998 season. Listed at 6' 3", 220 lb., he batted and threw right handed.

Born and raised in Anaheim, California, Hatcher attended University of Iowa, where he played college baseball for the Hawkeyes baseball team.

In between, Hatcher played winterball for the Navegantes del Magallanes club of the Venezuelan League in the 1993-94 season, as well as for the Lotte Giants of the Korea Baseball Organization in 2002.

Highlights
1998 Pacific Coast League Most Valuable Player

External links
, or Retrosheet, or Korea Baseball Organization, or Venezuelan Winter League

1969 births
Living people
American expatriate baseball players in Canada
American expatriate baseball players in South Korea
Auburn Astros players
Baseball players from Anaheim, California
Burlington Astros players
Colorado Springs Sky Sox players
Durham Bulls players
Edmonton Trappers players
Iowa Cubs players
Iowa Hawkeyes baseball players
Jackson Generals (Texas League) players
Kansas City Royals players
KBO League outfielders
Lotte Giants players
Major League Baseball outfielders
Navegantes del Magallanes players
American expatriate baseball players in Venezuela
Omaha Royals players
Osceola Astros players
Pacific Coast League MVP award winners
Tucson Toros players
Wichita Wranglers players
American expatriate baseball players in Australia